FOGL may refer to:
 József Fogl (also ~ Fogoly, Fogl III or József Újpesti / 1897–1971), Hungarian footballer (Újpest FC, Hungary, 1924 Olympics).
 Károly Fogl (also ~ Fogoly, Fogl II, or Károly Újpesti / 1895–1969), Hungarian footballer (Újpest FC, Vasas SC, Hungary, 1924 Olympics).
 Falkland Oil and Gas